{{DISPLAYTITLE:Upsilon2 Hydrae}}

Upsilon2 Hydrae, Latinised from υ2 Hydrae, is a solitary star in the equatorial constellation of Hydra. Visible to the naked eye, it is photometrically stable with an apparent visual magnitude of 4.59. Based upon an annual parallax shift of 10.40 mas as seen from Earth, it is located about 314 light-years from the Sun.

This is a B-type star with a stellar classification of B9 III-IV, showing partial traits of a subgiant and giant star in its spectrum. However, Zorec and Royer (2012) estimate the star still only 79% of the way through its life span on the main sequence. With an age of around 97 million years, it is spinning with a projected rotational velocity of 58 km/s. The star has an estimated 3.29 times the mass of the Sun and around 3.2 times the Sun's radius.

References

B-type subgiants
B-type giants
Hydra (constellation)
Hydrae, Upsilon2
Hydrae, 40
087504
049402
3970
Durchmusterung objects